Namiq Yusifov (born 14 August 1986) is an Azerbaijani professional footballer who played as a midfielder. He has played one match for Azerbaijan U21 against Belarus U21.

Career statistics

Club

References

External links
 

1986 births
Living people
Association football midfielders
Azerbaijani footballers
Qarabağ FK players
Azerbaijan Premier League players
Azerbaijan under-21 international footballers
FK MKT Araz players
Neftçi PFK players